Edward Baumeister (June 24, 1848 – May 26, 1933) was an American politician in the state of Washington. He served in the Washington State Senate from 1901 to 1905.

References

1848 births
1933 deaths
Republican Party Washington (state) state senators